Tank Universal is a computer game developed by New Zealand studio Dialogue Design and published by Meridian4. It currently features a 20-level single player campaign as well as a skirmish mode. Its graphical style has been described as "Tron-like", while its gameplay takes inspiration from the classic Atari title Battlezone. As of August 21, 2008, it is available on Valve's Steam digital distribution service.

Notes

External links
 Tank Universal homepage Official Tank Universal web site.
 Meridian 4 - Games - Tank Universal Publisher Meridian4 web page.
 Tank Universal on Steam Distributor web page on Steam.
 IGN Review Review on IGN.com

2008 video games
Cyberpunk video games
First-person shooters
Tank simulation video games
Video games developed in New Zealand
Windows games
Windows-only games
Meridian4 games
Single-player video games